Mercè Pons is a known Spanish TV, dubbing, theatre and movie actress born in 1966.

Experienced in theatres and discos, she has taken part in several movies and TV series like Abuela de verano or Compañeros. She has dubbed herself in several films and made more works related to dubbing, like Animals ferits in 2006.

Filmography
 Ens veiem demà (2009)
Para que nadie olvide tu nombre (2006)
Animales heridos (2006)
La Atlántida (2005)
Amor idiota (2004)
Iris (2004)
Valentín (2002)
Km. 0 (2000)
Morir (o no) (2000)
Carícies (1998)
Actrius (1997)
Puede ser divertido (1995)
El perquè de tot plegat (1995)
El pasajero clandestino (1995)
La novia moderna (1995)
Atolladero (1995)
Souvenir (1994)
El beso perfecto (1994)
La febre d'or(1993)
Bufons i reis (1993)
A Sorte cambia (1991)
Nunca estás en casa (1991)
Rateta, rateta (1990)

External links

1966 births
Living people
Film actresses from Catalonia
Spanish voice actresses
Television actresses from Catalonia
Spanish stage actresses
20th-century Spanish actresses
21st-century Spanish actresses